The following elections occurred in the year 1847.

Africa

Liberia 

 1847 Liberian general election

North America

United States
 1847 New York special judicial election
 1847 New York state election
 1847 Texas gubernatorial election

Europe

United Kingdom
 1847 United Kingdom general election

See also
 :Category:1847 elections

1847
Elections